Graphiola is a genus of fungi belonging to the family Graphiolaceae.

The genus has cosmopolitan distribution.

Species

Species:
 Graphiola applanata 
 Graphiola arengae 
 Graphiola borassi

References

Fungi